Boris Lipnitzki (1887–1971) was a Russian Empire-born French photographer of the arts; ballet, fashion, cinema, visual art, writing and music.

Biography 
Haim Efime Boris Lipnitzki (or Lipnitzky) was born into a Jewish family in Oster, in Chernihiv Province of the Russian Empire (now Ukraine) on 4 February 1887. He died in Paris on 6 July 1971, aged 84, and is buried in Pere Lachaise cemetery.

Photographer 

Lipnitzki first worked for a photographer in Odessa, then opened his own studio in Pultusk. He arrived in Paris in the early 1920s. There, he established a studio at 40 rue du Colisée, where he photographed many of the artistic personalities of the 20th century from the 1920s-1960s, as well as picturing them in their own surroundings. His friendship with fashion designer Paul Poiret, with whom he would stay to photograph in Biarritz, provided an entrée into these circles.

His subjects included Maurice Ravel, René Hubert, Albert Camus, Blaise Cendrars, Jean Cocteau, Otto Preminger, Igor Strawinsky, Arthur Honegger, Leonid Massine, Serge Lifar, Paul Poiret, Coco Chanel, Olga Spessivtseva, Nyota Inyoka, Tamara Karsavina, Serge Gainsbourg, Les Six, Marc Chagall, Pablo Picasso, as well as Josephine Baker of whom in 1926 he made a famous series of nude photographs.

Lipnitzki was a stills photographer on Gance's Napoléon and caught more informal views of crew and actors relaxing, his pictures being used on the covers of the programs and displayed in cinemas, but despite assurances, he was not given credit for them. A trial followed in the Seine tribunal and the producer of the film was ordered to pay 30,000 francs (about US$16000 in 2010) to Lipnitzki. The industry publication Le Photographe called attention to this as a precedent in French copyright law. He also recorded many major ballet performances and made studio portraits of dancers.

Photographs by Lipnitski were published in Femina, The Paris Times, Paris-Alger magazine, Les Modes, La Vie parisienne, Chantecler revue, Vogue (Paris), L'Atlantique, Paris-soir, La Femme de France, Être belle, Le Photographe, Le Point, Adam: revue des modes masculines en France et à l'étranger, Ambiance, Comoedia, Claudine, Le Monde illustré, L'Art musical, Bravo, Le Petit journal, Le Théâtre et Comœdia illustré and others.

In an article on the relative value of hand-drawn and photographic illustration, Robert Lang director/editor of Rester Jeune, describing the stylistic of various illustrators and photographers, writes of Lipnitzki that he "is fond of halos and his art parallels that of the theatre".

Lipnitzki's prodigious output was decimated when the Athenaeum theatre, where his friend Louis Jouvet had helped him hide his prints during the Occupation was flooded while he had fled to stay with his friend Chagall in New York .

Post-war 
After the war, he and his brothers established the Lipnitzki Studio which was in full production and by 1946 was advertising for staff,  and operated until just before Lipnitzki died. In the mid-50s, his nephew Bernard Lipnitski joined the studio for three years, before being hired by weekly magazine France Dimanche, for which he photographed Céline Monsarrat, Françoise Sagan and Salvador Dali, then was employed as a photojournalist by other French magazines. Boris Lipnitzki continued to agitate for copyright law in relation to professional photography and his opinion and participation was sought, amongst other instances, by the meeting of Commission des Droits d'Auteur of February 1945, and on other occasions.

Legacy 
In 1970, his collection—more than a million negatives and 600,000 prints—and that of his nephew, was bought by the Roger-Viollet agency. Attribution of images from the studio made 1945–1969 to a particular photographer amongst the brothers is not always certain.

Publications

Solo exhibitions 

 2005, 7 May – 12 Jun: Boris Lipnitzki, Espace Saint-Jean, Melun

Group exhibitions 
 2019–20, 26 Oct 2019 – 19 Jan: 1925 - 1935, Une décennie bouleversante (a decade of change), with Marcel Arthaud, Laure-Albin Guillot, Jean Moral, André Papillon, Gaston Paris & others, Musée Nicéphore Niépce, Chalon-sur-Saône
 27 Nov 2013 – 31 Mar 2014: Biographical forms: Construction and individual mythology, with Brassaï, Günter Brus, Claude Cahun, Bruce Conner, VALIE EXPORT, Tomislav Gotovac, Raymond Hains, Santu Mofokeng, Nadar (Gaspard-Félix Tournachon), Henrik Olesen, Ahlam Shibli, Ed Templeton, Jeff Wall, Francesca Woodman, & others, Museo Nacional Centro de Arte Reina Sofia (MNCARS), Madrid
 2011, 12 Nov – 29 Dec: Beispielhaft 3, with František Drtikol, Leo Fuchs, Charlotte March, Egbert Mittelstädt, Stefan Moses, Edward Quinn, Gerhard Riebicke, Valerie Schmidt, André Villers, Ira Vinokurova, KOELN-ART, Cologne
 2011, 12 May – 16 Jul: Some Photographs taken in France, with  Berenice Abbott, Eugène Atget, Denise Bellon, Ilse Bing, Erwin Blumenfeld, Brassaï, Henri Cartier-Bresson, André Adolphe-Eugène Disdéri, Louis-Emile Durandelle, Martin Kollar, Germaine Krull, Henri Le Secq, Man Ray, Willy Ronis, Raoul Ubac, & others,  Diemar/Noble Photography, London
 2008, 5 Apr – 1 Jun: CONTROVERSIES, with Annelies Štrba, Abbas, Ladislav Bielik, Guy Bourdin, Robert Capa, Lewis Carroll, Henri Cartier-Bresson, Larry Clark, Luc Delahaye, Robert Doisneau, Horst Faas, Frank Fournier, Marc Garanger, Gary Gross, Lewis Hine, Rip Hopkins, Irina Ionesco, Yevgeny Khaldei (Chaldej), Lehnert & Landrock, Michael Light, Man Ray, Edward Mapplethorpe, Steven Meisel, Nadar (Gaspard-Félix Tournachon), Sebastião Salgado, Andres Serrano, Jock Sturges, Oliviero Toscani, Nick Ut, & others, Musée de l'Elysée, Lausanne
 2005, 10 Feb – 20 Apr: Talking Pictures, with Peter Galadzhev, Lotte Jacobi, Germaine Krull, Fritz Lang, Man Ray, Raymond Voinquel, & others, Galerie Berinson, Berlin
 1984, 15 June – 1 September: Hommage à Claire Croiza,  Bibliothèque nationale, Music departement
 1978, 17 June – 1 October: André Barsacq : cinquante ans de théâtre, Bibliothèque nationale, Paris
 1964, 11 June–11 July: Guy Ropartz, Bibliothèque nationale
 1961-1962, December–March: Louis Jouvet : exposition organisée pour le dixième anniversaire de sa mort
 1957–1958, 19 December–28 February, Gustave Flaubert et Madame Bovary: exhibition organised for the centenary of the publication of the novel, Paris, Bibliothèque nationale
1930 27 Feb – 9 Mar: 7th Exposition de la Photographie et du Cinéma, with Genia Reinberg, Germaine Douazi, Vallois, Wilfrid Sketch, Pierre Petit, Nadar, Charles Martin, Lemonnier, Charles Gerschel, Duvivier, Charles Rouget. Parc des Expositions, Porte de Versailles

Collections 
 Musée Niepce
 Bibliothèque nationale de France

References 

French photographers
Soviet emigrants to France
1887 births
1971 deaths
Portrait photographers
Dance photographers